The knockout stage of the EuroBasket 2015 took place between 12 September and 20 September 2015. All games were played at Stade Pierre-Mauroy in Lille, France.

The top four teams of each preliminary group advanced.

Olympic games qualification format
While the Eurobasket champion and the runner-up automatically qualify for the 2016 Summer Olympics, the two losers of the semifinals advanced to the Olympic qualification tournament. The four losers of the quarterfinals played two extra playoff rounds in order to determine the three remaining OQT participants: 5–8 semifinals (the winners advancing to the OQT) and a 7–8 final (the winner advanced to the OQT and the loser was eliminated).

Qualified teams

Bracket
Olympic qualifying bracket
The winners of the 5–8th place semifinals advanced to the qualification tournament. The 5–8th place semifinals losers played in the seventh place game to determine the last participant.

All times are local (UTC+2).

Round of 16

Latvia v Slovenia

Greece v Belgium

Spain v Poland

France v Turkey

Croatia v Czech Republic

Serbia v Finland

Israel v Italy

Lithuania v Georgia

Quarterfinals

Spain v Greece

France v Latvia

Serbia v Czech Republic

Italy v Lithuania

Olympic qualifying playoff games

Greece v Latvia

Czech Republic v Italy

Seventh place game

Semifinals

Spain v France

Serbia v Lithuania

Third place game

Final

External links
Official website

knockout stage
International basketball competitions hosted by France
Sport in Lille